Waldo's People is a Finnish Eurodance band. The lead singer of the band is Waldo, whose real name is Marko Reijonen. They represented Finland in the Eurovision Song Contest 2009, with the song "Lose Control". It won a place for the Eurovision final on May 16 as the jury's chosen act. They finished in last place out of 25 entries with 22 points.

Waldo already had some success in a solo-career in mid-1990s. His band influenced Finnish electronic dance music in the late 1990s and early 2000s. Waldo's People's first video was U Drive Me Crazy. It was the first Finnish video included in MTV Nordic's daily video-rotation.

Discography

Albums

Compilations

Singles

Notes

External links
 

Finnish Eurodance groups
Eurovision Song Contest entrants for Finland
Eurovision Song Contest entrants of 2009